Hate Story 2 is a 2014 Indian Hindi-language erotic thriller film directed by Vishal Pandya. Produced by T-Series Films, it stars Sushant Singh, Surveen Chawla and Jay Bhanushali in pivotal roles. It is the sequel to the 2012 sleeper hit Hate Story. The film released on 18 July 2014. It is the second installment of Hate Story film series.

Plot

The film begins with an aged man entering a graveyard to lay flowers on somebody's grave. He hears the noise of someone struggling in a coffin nearby. To his utmost surprise, he discovers a girl buried alive in the coffin. He takes the girl to the hospital where Police Inspector Anton Varghese (Siddharth Kher), tells the doctor to let him know as soon as she regains consciousness. The officer guarding the girl's room calls an anonymous person informing him of the girl being alive. He tries to smother her but she is able to alert the nurse. Inspector Anton is called but the girl manages to escape from the hospital.

The girl is revealed to be Sonika (Surveen Chawla), the mistress of a powerful and influential political leader Mandar Mhatre (Sushant Singh). Sonika is a photography student who is kept isolated and, is tortured by Mandar. She reluctantly finds comfort in her college friend Akshay Bedi (Jay Bhanushali) who secretly loves her. They fall in love but Sonika is helpless since she can't tell Akshay about her situation with Mandar. Akshay gets to know the truth and comforts her. They decide to run away to be together. Sonika is happy and becomes hopeful of having a free life. Mandar discovers that she has eloped with her lover.

Mandar and his men reach Akshay's house and attack him. Sonika begs him to leave Akshay alone but they kill him by tying him to a rope and throwing him in a lake in a car. Mandar also buries Sonika alive in a coffin. After she is rescued she vows to exact vengeance upon Mandar. First kills the police officer who tried to kill her. Then she writes a journal describing her torture. She dives into the same lake and puts it in the car. She then kills one of the three men who was involved in killing Akshay. After that, she informs Inspector Anton about Akshay's dead body. However, Mandar makes it look like Sonika killed Akshay. Sonika then kills another one of Mandar's men involved in Akshay's death. Sonika teams up with Mandar's rival and to get to the third man who helped killed Akshay but Mandar himself kills him.

It is revealed that his rival had become a partner after Mandar offered to share his seats with him in the election. Mandar implicates Sonika in the murders and the police arrest her. However, she manages to escape with Anton's help. Then Sonika kills Mandar with Mandar's wife's help who discovers her husband's true face. Next day, Anton provides a locked house for Sonika to live there in the safety, giving her the new identity of 'Veronica', knowing that no-one would even contemplate that a fugitive is hiding in a safe house provided to her by the very officer leading the manhunt to find her.

Cast
 Surveen Chawla as Sonika Prasad
 Jay Bhanushali as Akshay Bedi
 Sushant Singh as Mandar Mhatre
 Siddharth Kher as Inspector Anton Varghese
 Rajesh Khera as Atul Mhatre
 Neha Kaul as Mandar's Wife
 Meet Arora as sub-inspector Vikram Gaekward
 Sunny Leone as item number "Pink Lips"

Production and promotion
Both lead actors learnt scuba diving for the film. Jasmin Oza did choreography for Hate Story 2. The trailer crossed 7 million views within 10 days of its release. Actress Sunny Leone was approached to perform an item song "Pink Lips".

The Indian censor boards objected to the sex scenes airing as part of the trailer and music video on TV channels, therefore the producers of the film edited certain portions. Comedian Kapil Sharma refused to promote the film on the grounds that he did not want to expose an erotic thriller to a family audience watching his TV show, Comedy Nights with Kapil.

Reception

Meena Iyer of The Times of India gave the film 2.5 stars out of 5 and wrote, "The proceedings on screen lack tempo that is needed for an erotic thriller." Sweta Kaushal of the Hindustan Times gave the film 1.0 stars out of 5 and wrote, "With a totally predictable story line and extremely illogical twists and turns, Hate Story 2 fails to entertain."

Vishal Pandya was named as the director of a sequel Hate Story 3 which was slated to begin shooting by November 2014.

Box office
The film was a commercial success with a nett gross of 22.9 crore and was declared "Average" by the Box Office India.

Soundtrack

The first song "Aaj Phir" is recreated song from 1988 film Dayavan.
The item song, "Pink Lips", which was pictured Sunny Leone, was is a promotional track for the film and became Bollywood full-fledged debut for Punjabi singer and actress Khushboo Grewal.

References

External links
 

Indian rape and revenge films
2014 films
Indian films about revenge
2010s Hindi-language films
2010s erotic thriller films
Indian erotic thriller films
Films scored by Sunny and Inder Bawra
T-Series (company) films
Films directed by Vishal Pandya